Sciuto is an Italian surname meaning "thin". Notable people with the surname include:

People
Alan Sciuto (born 1988), former racing driver
Donatella Sciuto (born 1962), Italian electronic engineer and academic administrator
Lucien Sciuto (1868–1947), Jewish journalist
Pablo Sciuto (born 1979), Uruguayan singer
Tony Sciuto (born 1952), American musician

Fictional characters
Abby Sciuto, a fictional character in the American television series NCIS

Italian-language surnames